The Alamogordo and Sacramento Mountain Railway was built as a branch line for the El Paso and Northeastern Railway (EP&NE). Construction began from the EP&NE connection at Alamogordo, New Mexico, in 1898 to reach the Sacramento Mountain fir and spruce forests to the east. Sawmills were built in Alamogordo to mill lumber for extension of the EP&NE to reach the Chicago, Rock Island and Pacific Railroad. The railroad reached Cloudcroft, New Mexico, in 1900, where a lodge was built for summer tourists to enjoy the cool mountain air. Cloudcroft was laid out in several villages so tourists might avoid associating too closely with loggers and railway workers. The railway was extended from Cloudcroft to the small community of Russia, New Mexico, in 1903; and several branches were built to reach timber for the Alamogordo Lumber Company.

Climbing from the Tularosa Basin of the later Trinity Test Site and White Sands Missile Range into the Sacramento Mountain fault block escarpments required numerous trestles, switchbacks and grades as steep as 6.4 %. The work was supervised by Horace Sumner, whose experience in Colorado included construction of the Denver and Rio Grande Western Railroad and the Florence and Cripple Creek Railroad. The result has been described as a standard gauge railroad built to narrow gauge standards. It was one of the most spectacular railroads of the American west.

The climb began in La Luz Canyon and reached Fresnel Canyon using trestles and two 36-degree curves. It climbed into Salado Canyon through a double horseshoe of 30-degree curves on a 4.2 percent grade to reach High Rolls. From Toboggan the line used a switchback with two trestles on a 22-degree curve with a 6 percent grade. The line then crossed Bailey's Canyon over a 30-degree curve on a  trestle and a 28-degree curve on a  trestle. The following  trestle  over Mexican Canyon still stands as a historic landmark. The climb to Cloudcroft was scheduled to take 2 hours and 50 minutes, and the descent back to Alamogordo took 2 hours and 25 minutes. As many as five daily excursion trains from El Paso, Texas, (with a $3 fare in 1907) were scheduled through the summer months, and one or two daily round trips provided passenger and mail service through the winter.

The line became part of the Phelps Dodge El Paso and Southwestern Railroad in 1905 and was leased by Southern Pacific Railroad in 1924. Summer excursions from El Paso were discontinued in 1930 and passenger and mail service ended in 1938. Freight service ended in 1947 and the line was dismantled through the summer of 1948, one half century after it had been built. The railroad owned one combine car, four open-sided excursion cars, and five cabooses in addition to the five wood-burning locomotives listed below. Additional 2-8-0s were used during Phelps Dodge control; and the Southern Pacific roster included 107 logging flatcars formerly owned by the lumber companies.

Locomotives

In addition to the above-listed locomotives owned by the Alamogordo and Sacramento Mountain Railway main line, the following lumber company Shay locomotives operated over logging branches:

References

Defunct New Mexico railroads
Logging railroads in the United States